Beaumont Island is an island of the Lincoln Sea, Greenland. Administratively it belongs to the Northeast Greenland National Park.

The inclusion of this island in determining the international boundary between Canadian and Danish waters was formerly a subject of disagreement following a 1973 treaty that left parts of the offshore boundary undefined, until the boundary in the Lincoln Sea was formalized in 2022.

Geography
Beaumont Island lies in the Lincoln Sea to the NNW of the mouth of Victoria Fjord. It is located almost 40 km NNE of Cape May, at the northern end of Wulff Land and 20 km west of John Murray Island. The waters around the island are icebound most of the year.

See also
List of islands of Greenland
Territorial claims in the Arctic

Bibliography
Michael Byers, Who Owns the Arctic?: Understanding Sovereignty Disputes in the North
George Nares Narrative of a voyage to the Polar Sea during 1875–6 in H.M. ships 'Alert' and 'Discovery'

References

External links
Maritime boundaries (Chapter 2) - International Law and the Arctic
Canada's Unresolved Maritime Boundaries
Uninhabited islands of Greenland